The 2011–12 Al-Oruba F.C. season is the Al-Oruba Football Club of Yemen season from 2011–2012 season.

Current first team squad

Yemeni League

Matches

Results
Kickoff times are in GMT.

Yemeni Super Cup

AFC Cup

Group stage 

Notes
Due to the political crisis in Yemen, the AFC requested Yemeni clubs to play their home matches at neutral venues.

Statistics

Goals

See also 
 2010–11 season

Notes

References

External links
goalzz.com - English
kooora.com - Arabic

Al-Oruba F.C. seasons
Al-Oruba F.C. season